İç Ada (literally "internal island";) is a Turkish islet near Kaş (ancient Antiphellos), in the homonymous district of Antalya province. It lies in the eastern Mediterranean Sea, about five nautical miles west-southwest of the island of Kekova, and about halfway between Kekova and the Greek islet of Stroggyli. Iç Ada is uninhabited and is covered with macchia.

Contended between Italy and Turkey after the Italian occupation of Kastelorizo,  the 1932 Convention between Italy and Turkey which defined the sea border between the two powers assigned it to Turkey.

Notes

Sources

See also 
 List of islands of Turkey

Uninhabited islands of Turkey
Antalya
Turkish Riviera
Islands of Antalya Province
Islands of Turkey